The Dames Ligue 1 (Women's League 1) is Luxembourg's top level women's football (soccer) league.

The league featured a different quantity of teams through the years (eight or ten usually) and in 2019–20 features 12 teams that play each other twice to decide the champion.

The champion qualifies for a spot in the UEFA Women's Champions League. But it has not always being taken. The first year a team of Luxembourg entered European competition was in 2001–02 when Progrès Niederkorn finished 3 games with 0 points and 0-32 goals. Progrès Niederkorn entered the competition again in 2011–12, Jeunesse Junglinster represented Luxembourg at the 2015–16 edition and SC Bettembourg at the 2017–18 and 2019–20 editions.

2022–23 teams
The following 12 teams are competing in the 2022–23 season 

 SC Bettembourg
 FC Blo Wäiss Izeg 
 SC Ell
 Entente Differdingen-Luna
 Jeunesse Junglinster
 FC Mamer
 Racing
 FC Red Black/Egalité 07 Pfaffenthal-Weimerskirch
 Union Mertert
 Wincrange-Wiltz
 Wormeldange-Munsbach-CSG
 FCM Young Boys

Champions
A list of all champions.

Record Champions

References

External links
Official Site
League at uefa.com
League at women.soccerway.com

1
Lux
Women
Women's sports leagues in Luxembourg